Qaleh Now-e Amlak (also Romanized as Qal‘eh Now-e Amlāk; also known as Qal‘eh Now) is a village in Ferunabad Rural District of the Central District of Pakdasht County, Tehran province, Iran. At the 2006 National Census, its population was 1,851 in 442 households. The following census in 2011 counted 3,000 people in 801 households. The latest census in 2016 showed a population of 3,432 people in 955 households; it was the largest village in its rural district.

References 

Pakdasht County

Populated places in Tehran Province

Populated places in Pakdasht County